The First Immortal (1998) is a novel by James L. Halperin about life of a man born in 1925 who dies in 1988 and is re-animated after a cryonics procedure. The novel spans 200 years and gives a futuristic account of the first immortal human.  The novel explores the future prospects of cryonics, A.I., nanotechnology, and eternal life. It is the sequel to Halperin's earlier book, The Truth Machine.

It is recommended as an educational resource by the two major cryonics organizations, Alcor Life Extension Foundation and Cryonics Institute.

The novel was optioned as a Hallmark Hall of Fame miniseries, but the miniseries was never produced.

1998 novels
Cryonics in fiction
Transhumanist books
Del Rey books